Clemen Chiang is a Singaporean entrepreneur (co-founder of CozyCot and founder of Spiking) and member of Boards of Directors of several companies listed in the Singapore and Hong Kong Stock Exchanges.

Education
Clemen Chiang studied mathematics, physics, and economics at Victoria Junior College. In 2000, he received a Bachelor’s Degree in Civil and Structural Engineering from the Nanyang Technological University and, in 2002, a Master of Business Administration with an emphasis in Entrepreneurship from the University of Louisville. In 2017, he graduated as a Doctor of Philosophy in Management from the University of Canberra, with a thesis examining the impact of viral marketing on social action within computer-mediated social network sites.

Career
In 2001, Chiang and his wife Nicole Yee co-founded CozyCot, a social networking website for Asian women. He led the company’s tech development. The portal became Singapore's largest online women community, in 2010 with over 500,000 unique visitors each month. It expanded also geographically, in the rest of East Asia and among Asian women from United States, Australia and New Zealand, becoming one of the local websites "putting Singapore on the global map". In 2010, CozyCot Pte. Ltd. attracted an undisclosed investment from Hong Kong's JDB Holdings, thus making the company majority-owned by JDB.

In 2012, Clemen Chiang and Nicole Yee brought for the first time in Singapore the concept of Dîner en Blanc, also a first for an Asian country. They continued to host it for a few more years.

Later, Chiang developed the social trading platform Spiking, launched in 2016. The idea grew from his personal observations as a private investor of 15 years. In order to make better sense of unexplained spikes in market activity, he thought of a platform to consolidate big data and relevant information and he spent 20 months and $250,000 developing the app. The platform provides financial information about several stock exchange markets in Asia and Australia. It consolidates disclosures published on several markets by tracking the selling and buying patterns (with AI technology) and also by tracking investors from these markets.

Personal life
Chiang is married to Nicole Yee and has three sons. He plays rugby and is a taekwondo black-belt.

Boards of Directors membership
 Independent Director, Board of Directors, Travelite Holdings Ltd (SGX)
 Independent Non-Executive Director, Board of Directors, Asia Television Holdings Limited (HKEX)
 Advisor, Advisory Board, SMI Vantage Ltd (SGX)

Bibliography
 Spiking To The Moon: A Beginner’s Guide To Understanding Whales In The Cryptocurrency Market (2018)

References

Victoria Junior College alumni
Nanyang Technological University alumni
University of Louisville alumni
University of Canberra alumni
Singaporean financial businesspeople
Singaporean chairpersons of corporations
Singaporean people of Chinese descent
Living people
Year of birth missing (living people)